Cozier is a surname. Notable people with the surname include:

Jimmy Cozier (born 1977), American soul musician
Mac Cozier (born 1973), American expatriate soccer player
Tony Cozier (1940–2016), Barbadian journalist, writer, and radio commentator

See also
Crozier (surname)